Evander Holyfield vs. Rickey Parkey was a professional boxing match contested on February 14, 1987 for the WBA and IBF cruiserweight title.

Background
After defeating his friend and former Olympic teammate Henry Tillman in his first successful title defense of his WBA cruiserweight title, Evander Holyfield next agreed to a unification bout with IBF cruiserweight champion Rickey Parkey. At first, only the IBF agreed to sanction the fight, while the WBA was initially reluctant. The Nevada Athletic Commission had withdrawn its membership from the WBA due to a dispute over two judges the WBA had chosen to score the Holyfield–Tillman fight and also because the WBA continued to recognize fighters from South Africa, a country the commission did not recognize. As a result, the WBA not only threatened to withdraw its sanctioning of both the Holyfield–Parkey cruiserweight title fight and the Mike Tyson–Pinklon Thomas heavyweight title fight, but to strip any of its champions should they chose to fight in Nevada. On the day of the fight, the WBA announced it would not sanction the fight, but would not strip Holyfield of the title though the title would be declared vacant should Parkey win. The following day the WBA and Nevada Athletic Commission would end their dispute after the WBA agreed to correct the issues that the commission had, this led the WBA to retroactively sanction the Holyfield–Parkey bout.

The fight
After sweeping all three of the judge's scorecards in rounds one and two, Holyfield would bring an end to the fight in the third. Midway through the round, Holyfield stunned Parkey with consecutive right hands and then swarmed in with a combination that dropped Parkey to the canvas. After taking a knee, Parkey rose to his feet and continued the fight but Holyfield quickly sent him down again. Parkey again beat the referee's count and was allowed to continue. Holyfield again went on the attack and landed a barrage of unanswered punches, with Parkey offering no offense, the referee called the fight just as Holyfield landed another right hand that sent Parkey down one last time. Holyfield was named the winner by technical knockout at 2:44 of the round.

Fight card

References

1987 in boxing
Boxing in Las Vegas
Parkey
May 1987 sports events in the United States